Neckwear refers to various styles of clothing worn around the (human) neck. They are worn for fashion, combat, or protection against the influences of weather. Common neckwear today includes bow ties, neckties (cravat), scarves, feather boas and shawls. Historically, ruffs and bands were worn.

Image gallery